Mount Pelion West is a mountain located in the Central Highlands region of Tasmania, Australia. The mountain is part of the Pelion Range and is situated within the Cradle Mountain-Lake St Clair National Park at the easternmost boundary of the Murchison River catchment.

Mountain location 
The mountain summit is at grid reference 152682 UTM Zone 55S and high resolution topographical information is available on Tasmap Achilles (4036) 1:25000. Below the northern side of the mountain is Pelion Creek which flows into the head waters of the Forth River. The Forth River has its origin directly east of Pelion West at Frog Flats ( above sea level), the lowest point on the whole Overland Track. At its closest point the Overland Track passes within  of the mountain summit.

Ascending
Keith Ernest Lancaster, an early bushwalking and mountain climbing pioneer, climbed Mount Pelion West on 30 January 1946 by enduring a slow and painful crawl through sections of the sharp and prickly Richea scoparia that frequently inhabits alpine areas around Tasmanian mountains.  Lancaster referred to Mount Pelion West as one of "The Giants of the Reserve". In his account of his climb Lancaster mentions "the confusion of the enormous boulders" on the top of the mountain.

On the Achilles Tasmap is marked the approximate location of a walking track to climb the mountain along its northeastern spur. This mountain is much more difficult to climb than either Mount Ossa or Mount Pelion East, the more traditional side-excursion climbs along the famous  Overland Track.

Gallery

See also

 Cradle Mountain-Lake St Clair National Park
 List of highest mountains of Tasmania

References

Pelion West
Pelion West
Pelion West